I11 or I-11 may refer to:
 AISA I-11, a two-seat civil utility aircraft
 Interstate 11, a highway in the United States
 Japanese submarine I-11, a Type A1 submarine of the Japanese Imperial Navy
 Kronoberg Regiment, a Swedish Army infantry regiment designated as  I 11 and I 11/Fo 16
 NMBS/SNCB I11 coach, a type of Belgian passenger rail vehicle
 VEF I-11, a Latvian light aircraft